It’s in the Air is a 1938 British comedy film written and directed by Anthony Kimmins and starring George Formby, Polly Ward and Jack Hobbs. The film was released in the United States with the alternative title George Takes the Air in 1940. The film depicts Great Britain's preparations for war with Air Raid Warden training, mock air attacks dropping poison gas bombs, and the deployment of anti-aircraft weapons in the streets.

Plot
George Brown (George Formby) is rejected as an Air Raid Warden, but, subsequently, his dreams of flying would soon come true. When he dons his brother-in-law's Royal Air Force uniform, he realises that his brother-in-law, who had "signed up", has left behind some very important papers in the pockets. He delivers the despatches to a nearby RAF station, whereupon George is mistaken for a despatch rider from headquarters.

George soon becomes the butt of jokes from his corporal which ends up with his staying indefinitely at the RAF air base. George, who has the inability to know his right from his left but not right from wrong soon falls in love with the Sergeant Major's daughter, Peggy (Polly Ward) a base NAAFI girl and when Corporal Craig (Jack Hobbs) who also fancies her, discovers his real identity, he threatens to report George.

On the day of an annual inspection, George attempts to escape the base and ends up in a Hawker Audax aircraft that is being readied for a test flight. While the inspector watches, George's aerial display is memorable and the inspector insists he should be commended in order to save their skins. George manages to land the aircraft and is accepted as a flyer by the RAF.

Cast

 George Formby as George Brown
 Polly Ward as Peggy
 Jack Hobbs as Cpl. Craig
 Julien Mitchell as The Sergeant Major
 Garry Marsh as Commanding Officer Hill
 Ilena Sylva as Anne Brown
 Frank Leighton as Pvt. Bob Bullock.
 C. Denier Warren as Sir Philip 
 Michael Shepley as Adjutant 
 Hal Gordon as Nobby Clark, mechanic 
 Joe Cunningham as Flight Sergeant 
 Jack Melford as Lt. Terry, pilot 
 Eliot Makeham as Sir Philip's Gardener  
 Esma Cannon as Sir Philip's Maid  
 O. B. Clarence as Sir Philip's Gardener  
 Philip Godfrey as 2nd. Ambulance Man 
 Bryan Herbert as RAF Corporal Organising Concert  
 Philip Ray as Airman with Shoe  
 John Salew as RAF Radio Operator 
 Jack Vyvian as Corporal in Ambulance

Production
It’s in the Air was partly made at the former London Air Park in Feltham, Middlesex. The film's art direction is by Wilfred Shingleton. The scenes of the air-raid exercise at the opening of the film are taken from the scenes of an aerial attack in Alexander Korda's Things to Come (1936).<ref>[https://www.imdb.com/title/tt0030283/trivia?ref_=tt_trv_trv "Trivia: George Takes the Air'."] IMDb, 2019. Retrieved: 11 July 2019.</ref>

The aircraft in It’s in the Air were:
 Hawker Audax (K8334) (K3081) 
 Hawker Demon (K3947) 
 Armstrong Whitworth Atlas (K1195)  
 Blackburn B.2 (G-ADFN), (G-ADLF) 
 Bristol Bulldog IIA (K3512)

Soundtrack
 "It's In The Air"
Written by Harry Parr-Davies; performed by George Formby and the chorus
 "Our Sergeant Major"
Written by George Formby, Harry Gifford and Fred E. Cliffe
 "They Can't Fool Me"
Written by George Formby, Harry Gifford and Fred E. Cliffe; performed by George Formby
 "The Bell's Of St Mary's"
Music by A. Emmett Adams and lyrics by Douglas Furber; performed by an unidentified airman

ReceptionThe New York Times critic Bosley Crowther called It’s in the Air a "fast and crazy farce, typically British, typically slapstick. As a specimen of war-time [sic] culture it should not be overlooked".

Aviation film historian James H. Farmer in Celluloid Wings: The Impact of Movies on Aviation (1984) considered It’s in the Air, " Fast-paced, typically British slapstick humour." 

References
Notes

Citations

Bibliography

 Farmer, James H. Celluloid Wings: The Impact of Movies on Aviation (1st ed.). Blue Ridge Summit, Pennsylvania: TAB Books 1984. .
 Pendo, Stephen. Aviation in the Cinema. Lanham, Maryland: Scarecrow Press, 1985. .
 Skogsberg, Bertil. Wings on the Screen. San Diego: A.S. Barnes & Company, Inc., 1981. .

Further reading
 Low, Rachael. Filmmaking in 1930s Britain. London: George Allen & Unwin, 1985. .
 Perry, George. Forever Ealing. London: Pavilion Books, 1994. .
 Wood, Linda. British Films, 1927-1939''. London: British Film Institute, 1986. .

External links
 
 

1938 films
1938 comedy films
British comedy films
British aviation films
Royal Air Force mass media
Associated Talking Pictures
Films directed by Anthony Kimmins
Films set in England
Military humor in film
British black-and-white films
Ealing Studios films
1940s English-language films
1930s English-language films
1940s British films
1930s British films